Alipes grandidieri most commonly known as the feather-tail centipede, is a centipede that lives in Eastern Africa. It is 10–15 cm long. It is part of the genus Alipes and the family Scolopendridae.

It was first described in Zanzibar, as Eucorybas Grandidieri [sic] by Lucas in 1864.

The species range is Kenya, Tanzania and Uganda. It has distinctive back legs that look like they have feathers. When threatened they will shake their back legs and make a hissing sound.

References 

Arthropods of Africa
Scolopendridae
Animals described in 1864